Taybe Mustafa Yusein (born 4 May 1991 in Kubrat) is a Bulgarian wrestler. She competes in 59 kg division and has won a total of six World championship medals and eight European championship medals.

In 2021, she won one of the bronze medals in her event at the Poland Open held in Warsaw, Poland. She also won one of the bronze medals in the women's freestyle 62 kg event at the 2020 Summer Olympics held in Tokyo, Japan. In her spare time, Yusein enjoys reading, especially crime fiction.

In 2022, she won the silver medal in the 62 kg event at the Dan Kolov & Nikola Petrov Tournament held in Veliko Tarnovo, Bulgaria. She lost her bronze medal match in her event at the Yasar Dogu Tournament held in Istanbul, Turkey. She won the gold medal in the 62 kg event at the 2022 European Wrestling Championships held in Budapest, Hungary.

She won the gold medal in the women's 65kg event at the Grand Prix de France Henri Deglane 2023 held in Nice, France.

References

External links
 

1991 births
Living people
Bulgarian female sport wrestlers
Bulgarian people of Turkish descent
European Games medalists in wrestling
European Games bronze medalists for Bulgaria
Wrestlers at the 2015 European Games
Wrestlers at the 2016 Summer Olympics
Olympic wrestlers of Bulgaria

World Wrestling Championships medalists
People from Kubrat (town)
Wrestlers at the 2019 European Games
European Wrestling Championships medalists
Wrestlers at the 2020 Summer Olympics
Medalists at the 2020 Summer Olympics
Olympic medalists in wrestling
Olympic bronze medalists for Bulgaria
European Wrestling Champions
21st-century Bulgarian women